Fair Oaks is a census-designated place (CDP) in Cobb County, Georgia, United States. The population was 9,028 at the 2020 census.

Fair Oaks lies just outside the city limits of Smyrna and Marietta, and the area uses "Smyrna" or "Marietta" for its mailing addresses. Except for actual residents of Fair Oaks, very few locals even know it exists as a separately-counted area. The name is also rarely used by local businesses, even in the immediate area. Mableton and Vinings, the only other CDPs in the county, are far better known.

The area was named for its many mature native oak trees. This, however, is threatened by nearby Dobbins Air Reserve Base and new Federal Aviation Administration regulations regarding flight paths for takeoff and landing. In 2005, the lower house of the Georgia General Assembly passed a resolution in support of the community, which was built in the early 20th century, well before the military base.

Geography
Fair Oaks is located at  (33.919802, -84.544507).

Demographics

As of the census of 2000, there were 8,443 people, 2,952 households, and 1,791 families residing in the CDP. The racial makeup of the CDP was 50.76% White, 23.83% African American, 0.72% Native American, 0.98% Asian, 0.01% Pacific Islander, 20.43% from other races, and 3.26% from two or more races. Hispanic or Latino of any race were 36.54% of the population.

There were 2,952 households, out of which 33.7% had children under the age of 18 living with them, 35.7% were married couples living together, 15.8% had a female householder with no husband present, and 39.3% were non-families. 28.4% of all households were made up of individuals, and 6.5% had someone living alone who was 65 years of age or older.  The average household size was 2.80 and the average family size was 3.32.

In the CDP, the population was spread out, with 25.7% under the age of 18, 15.6% from 18 to 24, 37.6% from 25 to 44, 14.6% from 45 to 64, and 6.5% who were 65 years of age or older.  The median age was 28 years. For every 100 females, there were 123.6 males.  For every 100 females age 18 and over, there were 128.5 males.

The median income for a household in the CDP was $31,766, and the median income for a family was $34,491. Males had a median income of $22,401 versus $21,491 for females. The per capita income for the CDP was $13,245.  About 11.9% of families and 15.0% of the population were below the poverty line, including 11.1% of those under age 18 and 15.7% of those age 65 or over.

References

Census-designated places in Cobb County, Georgia
Census-designated places in Georgia (U.S. state)